Ieroklis Michailidis (born 29 September 1960 in Ptolemaida) is a Greek actor. He appeared in more than twenty films since 1992.

Selected filmography

References

External links 

1960 births
Living people
Greek male film actors

People from Ptolemaida